Since the 1924 Olympics, 68 Oklahoma State University Olympians have won a total of 30 medals, 21 gold, 4 silver, and 5 bronze.  Oklahoma State University has been represented in every Olympics that the United States has competed in since 1924.

1924 - Paris

 Guy Lookabaugh - wrestled at 158.5 and received 4th place
 Orion Stuteville - wrestling participant

1928 - Amsterdam

 Clarence Berryman - wrestled at 145 and received 6th place
 George Rule - wrestling participant
 Charles Strack - wrestling participant
 Earl McCready - wrestling participant for Team Canada at Heavyweight

1932 - Los Angeles

 Bobby Pearce - won gold medal at 123 in wrestling
 Jack VanBebber - won gold medal at 158.5 in wrestling
 Melvin Clodfelter - wrestling participant at 145
 Conrald Caldwell - wrestling participant

1936 - Berlin

 Frank Lewis - won gold medal at 158.5 in wrestling
 Ross Flood - won silver medal at 123 in wrestling
 Roy Dunn - wrestling participant at Heavyweight
 Fred Parkey - wrestling participant
 Harley Strong - wrestling participant at 145
 George Chiga - wrestling participant for Team Canada at Heavyweight
 Edward Clark Gallagher - honorary coach
 Clarence Gallagher - trainer

1948 - London

 Bob Kurland - won gold medal as member of USA Basketball Team
 Jesse Renick - won gold medal as member of USA Basketball Team
 Hal Moore - wrestled at 136.5 and received 6th place
 William Jernigan - wrestling participant at 114.5
 Richard Hutton - wrestling participant at Heavyweight
 Art Griffith - coached the USA Wrestling Team
 Cliff Keen - manager for USA Wrestling Team

1952 - Helsinki

 Bob Kurland - won gold medal as a member of USA Basketball Team
 J.W. Mashburn - participated in track and field
 Raymond Swartz - coached the USA Wrestling Team
 Buel Patterson - manager for USA Wrestling Team

1956 - Melbourne

 J.W. Mashburn - won gold medal in the 1600 meter relay
 Myron Roderick - wrestled at 136.5 and received 4th place
 Dick Beattie - wrestling participant at 160.5
 Dr. James Graham - track and field team (pole vault)

1960 - Rome

 Doug Blubaugh - won gold medal in wrestling at 160.5
 Shelby Wilson - won gold medal in wrestling at 147.5

1964 - Tokyo

 Yojiro Uetake - won gold medal in wrestling at 125.5
 Bobby Douglas - wrestled at 138.5 and received 4th place
 Henry Iba - coached the USA Basketball Team
 Rex Perry - coached the USA Wrestling Team
 Myron Roderick - assistant coach for the USA Wrestling Team
 Fendley Collins - manager for the USA Wrestling Team

1968 - Mexico City

 Yojiro Uetake - won gold medal in wrestling at 125.5
 James King - won gold medal as member of USA Basketball Team
 Bobby Douglas - wrestling participant at 138.5
 Henry Iba - coached the USA Basketball Team
 Dr. Donald Cooper - physician for the USA Basketball Team
 Tom Von Ruden - 1,500m, finished ninth

1972 - Munich

 Gene Davis - wrestling participant at 136.5
 J. Robinson - Greco-Roman wrestling participant at 180.5
 Harry Geris - wrestled for Team Canada at Heavyweight
 Henry Iba - coached the USA Basketball Team

1976 - Montreal

 Gene Davis - won bronze medal in wrestling at 136.5
 Jimmy Jackson - wrestling participant at Heavyweight
 Harry Geris - wrestled for Team Canada at Heavyweight
 Chris McCubbins - participated for Team Canada in track and field

1984 - Los Angeles

 Gary Green - won gold medal as member of USA Baseball Team
 Bruce Baumgartner, grad student and assistant coach - won gold medal in wrestling
 Lee Roy Smith - wrestling participant at 136.5
 Henry Iba - coach of USA Basketball Team
 Bill McDaniel - doctor for USA Basketball Team

1988 - Seoul

 John Smith - won gold medal in wrestling at 136.5
 Kenny Monday - won gold medal in wrestling at 163
 Robin Ventura - won gold medal as member of USA Baseball Team
 Christine McMiken - participated in track and field for New Zealand
 Joe Seay - assistant coach for USA Wrestling Team

1992 - Barcelona

 John Smith - won gold medal in wrestling at 136.5
 Kenny Monday - won silver medal in wrestling at 163
 Kendall Cross - wrestling participant at 125.5
 Lee Roy Smith - coach of the USA Wrestling Team
 Bobby Douglas - coach of the USA Wrestling Team

1996 - Atlanta

 Michele Mary Smith - won gold medal as member of USA Softball Team
 Kendall Cross - won gold medal in wrestling at 125.5
 Kenny Monday - wrestled at 163 and received 6th place

2000 - Sydney

 Michele Mary Smith - won gold medal as member of USA Softball Team
 John Smith - coach of the USA Wrestling Team

2004 - Athens
 Daniel Cormier - wrestled
 Eric Guerrero - wrestled
 Jamill Kelly - won silver medal in wrestling
 Mindaugas Pukstas - participated for Lithuania in the marathon

2008 - Beijing 
 Melanie Roche - Won Bronze Medal in Softball competing for Australia
 Lauren Bay - Competed for Canada in Softball
 Daniel Cormier - Wrestling
 Steve Mocco - Advanced to the Quarterfinals in Wrestling

2012 - London 
 Coleman Scott - Won Bronze Medal in Wrestling at 60 kg 
 John Smith - Coached Team USA Wrestling

2016 - Rio de Janeiro 
 Rickie Fowler - Golf
 Caroline Masson - Competed for Germany in Golf
 Pernilla Lindberg - Competed for Sweden in Golf
 Shadrack Kipchirchir - Men's 10,000m
 Ingeborg Loevnes - Competed for Norway in Women's 3000m Steeplechase
 Nick Miller - Competed for Great Britain in Men's Hammer Throw
 Tom Farrell - Competed for Great Britain in Men's 5000m
 John Smith was a Wrestling TV analyst during the Games

2016 - Rio de Janeiro Paralympics 
 Cassie Mitchell - Won Silver Medal in discus throw and Bronze Medal in club throw

2020 - Tokyo 
 Adrianna Franch - Won Bronze Medal with USA Women's Soccer Team
 Caroline Masson - Competed for Germany in Golf
 Alex Norén - Competed for Sweden in Golf
 Viktor Hovland - Competed for Norway in Golf
 Nick Miller - Competed for Great Britain in Men's Hammer Throw and finished sixth
 Lauren Bay-Regula - Won Bronze Medal with Canadian Softball Team
 John Smith and Michele Smith (Softball) were TV analysts during the Games

References

 http://okstate.com/sports/2015/3/17/GEN_2014010165.aspx

Oklahoma State
Oklahoma State University Olympians
Oklahoma State University
Oklahoma State